Martin Kližan and Alessandro Motti were the defending champions but Kližan decided not to participate.
Motti played alongside Laurynas Grigelis.
Dustin Brown and Jonathan Marray won the final 6–4, 7–6(7–0) against Andrei Dăescu and Florin Mergea.

Seeds

Draw

Draw

References
 Main Draw

Rai Open - Doubles
2012 Doubles